Olivier, Baron de Brandois (21 June 1870 – 9 June 1916) was a French sailor who competed in the 1900 Summer Olympics in Le Havre, France. Baron de Brandois took the 4th place in the 20+ ton.

References

External links

 

French male sailors (sport)
Sailors at the 1900 Summer Olympics – 20+ ton
Olympic sailors of France
1870 births
1916 deaths
Sportspeople from Loir-et-Cher
Barons of France